Dichomeris byrsoxantha is a moth in the family Gelechiidae. It was described by Edward Meyrick in 1918. It is found in South Africa.

The forewings are ochreous orange tinged with ferruginous. The stigmata are dark fuscous, the discal approximated, transverse, the first rather oblique, the plical dot like, beneath the first discal. There is a terminal series of dark fuscous dots. The hindwings are grey.

References

Endemic moths of South Africa
Moths described in 1918
byrsoxantha